Gangwon Province is a province of South Korea, with its capital at Chuncheon. It is bound on the east by the East Sea, and borders Gyeonggi Province to its west, North Gyeongsang Province and North Chungcheong Province to its south, and the Military Demarcation Line to the north, separating it from North Korea's Kangwŏn Province. Before the division of Korea in 1945 Gangwon and Kangwŏn Provinces formed a single province. Pyeongchang County in Gangwon hosted the 2018 Winter Olympics and 2018 Winter Paralympics, with Gangwon hosting the 2024 Winter Youth Olympics.

History

Gangwon-do was one of the Eight Provinces of Korea during the Joseon Dynasty, formed in 1395, deriving its name from the names of the principal cities of Gangneung and the provincial capital Wonju.

In 1895 Gangwon-do was replaced by the Districts of Chuncheon (Chuncheon-bu) in the west and Gangneung (Gangneung-bu) in the east, with Wonju becoming a part of Chungju District.

In 1896 Korea was redivided into thirteen provinces, and the two districts were merged to re-form Gangwon-do Province. Although Wonju re-joined Gangwon-do, the provincial capital was moved to Chuncheon, where it remains.During the japanese rule of korea, it was known as Kōgen-dō.

In 1945 Gangwon-do, along with the rest of Korea, was divided by the 38th parallel north in 1945, to create American and Soviet zones of occupation in the south and north respectively, leading to Wonsan joining the northern half in 1946 to serve as its administrative center. In 1948, the southern half of the province became part of the new Republic of Korea. As a result of the Korean War Armistice Agreement of 1953, the boundary between the South and North Korean portions of the province was shifted north, to the Military Demarcation Line.

Geography

Landscape
The province's landscape is dominated by the Taebaek Mountains (called Taebaek Sanmaek) which almost reach the sea. As a consequence the coast is very steep.

Regions
Gangwon-do and its North Korean counterpart Kangwŏn are together referred to as the Gwandong region. The region west of the Taebaek Mountains is called Yeongseo, while the region east of the mountains is called Yeongdong. The term "Yeongdong" is frequently used in reference to transportation services from Seoul, meaning one might catch a bus or train on the Yeongdong Line, or drive to Gangneung on the Yeongdong Expressway.

Climate 
Gangwon-do's Köppen climate classification's climate class is occasionally humid subtropical, because in some of its areas, especially in most of Yeongdong, it's Cfa, otherwise, its climate class is Hot-summer humid continental climate, because it's Dwb in some mountain areas, Dfa in eastern areas, Dfb in eastern mountain areas, and Dwa otherwise. The Taebaek Mountains create 

different climates in Yeongdong and Yeongseo.

The climate of Gangwon-do is influenced by its latitude. In summer, along with higher temperatures, high humidity is present, however in winter the weather can be very cold, due to high pressure from eastern Asia. According to the Korea Meteorological Administration's data, average temperatures vary.

Resources 
The province is renowned for its agricultural produce, especially potatoes and fish, including cuttlefish and pollock. Mineral resources from the province include iron, coal, fluorite, limestone and tungsten. There are some hydroelectric, thermoelectric power plants in the region.

Demographics

Culture and Heritages

Heritage 
It is unknown when the first people of Gangwon began to live, but Paleolithic sites have been excavated.

Many historical artifacts are found in the region, like the Later Silla era's Bell of Sangwonsa,  the North–South States Period era's Iron Seated Vairocana Buddha of Dopiansa Temple, the Goryeo era's Main Gate of Imyeonggwan Guesthouse, and the Joseon era's Documents of Sangwonsa Temple. Other popular historical areas, like Ojukheon are located in the region.

Because of Gangwon Province's landscape, a number of old Buddhist temples have survived, like Woljeongsa and Oseam.

Museums 
Established in 2002, the Chuncheon National Museum is operated by the central government for the purpose of classification and reservation. The local government also has museums, including the Park Su-geun Art Museum, and the Taebaek Coal Museum. Purpose-built private museums, such as the ChamSori Gramophone Edison Museum are also operated.

Festivals 
In Gangwon Province, almost all of the regions hold festivals. Gangneung Danoje was listed in UNESCO's Masterpieces of the Oral and Intangible Heritage of Humanity.

Geographically, Gangwon Province has several national parks as well as some natural monuments.

Food 
Gangwon Province is composed of mountains or basins, so locals mainly make food with potatoes or buckwheat. All regions of the province have seasoned vegetable rice. For example, Jeongseon County is famous for Jeongseon thistle rice; Yeongwol County is famous for Yeongwol buckwheat rolls; Hwacheon County is famous for Hwacheon trout rice in a stone bowl and Hwacheon goatsbeard rice; and Yanggu County is famous for Yanggu dried green radish cuisine. In coastal regions, fish and salted seafood is consumed. For example, Donghae City is famous for Donghae steamed fish; Sokcho is famous for Sokcho Squid Sausages; and Samcheok is famous for blowfish soup. These are normally very simple and easy to cook, like the province's traditional food.

Tourism

National Parks & Nature Monuments 
Due to the Taebaek Mountains, Gangwon Province has 4 national parks & several natural monuments.
 Seoraksan National Park
Seoraksan National Park has rocky terrain around Daecheongbong, and was listed in the Man and the Biosphere Programme. The government designated the area as a nature reserve in 1965, and UNESCO designated it as a biosphere reserve in 1982. It was also the first Korean national park to be named under the National Park Law in 1970. It is popular with tourists and nature enthusiasts, and home to many rare flora and fauna making it valued for its floral diversity. The reserve spans , and includes many mountain peaks measuring over 1,200 metres above sea level, the tallest being Daecheongbong, at an altitude of 1,708 metres. The ranges are composed largely of dissected granite and gneiss. There are about 1,013 species of plants known, with 822 vascular plant species. Pine trees such as the Siberian pine are abundant on the southern slopes whilst the northern slopes of the mountain range are characterized by oaks and other deciduous trees. Thuja grow in the deep valleys, dwarf pines and yews grow on low and high slopes. Juniper, hawthorn, forsythias, saw-worts and Manchurian fir can be found, with rare plants in the reserve including Hanabusaya asiatica. 1,562 animal species have been classified so far. including otters, the Siberian flying squirrel, kestrel, Chinese sparrowhawk, lenok, Chinese minnow, and the spotted barbel. Endangered animals include the Tristram's woodpecker, Korean goral, and Korean musk deer. Cultural landmarks in the reserve include the Buddhist temples Baekdamsa and Sinheungsa.
Odaesan National Park
Odaesan is located in the center of Baekdudaegan, and it was assigned as a national park in 1975. Odaesan is one of the holy places of Korean Buddhist cultures.
 Chiaksan National Park
Chiaksan is derived from the southwest side of Odaesan, close to Wonju. In 2014, Wonju and the Korea National Park Service collaborated to make walking routes.
 Taebaeksan National Park
Taebaeksan is a traditional and historical "holy mountain," and it was assigned as a national park on October 22, 2016. Taebaeksan Mountain is located at the fork of Baekdudaegan Mountain Range, which starts from Bagdu into the south, heading to Jirisan Mountain. Ever since it has been designated as a provincial park, Taebaeksan Mountain has widened its realm and thus designated it as the 22nd national park. The park ranges from Gangwon-do Province to Gyeongsangbuk-do Province (Bongwha-gun) and spans . There are various cultural assets in Taebaeksan Mountain including Cheonjaedan, a place where a harvest ceremony had been held for thousands of years, and Geomryongso, the source of the Han River. It also has various and outstanding ecological landscapes including the biggest wildflower habitat in the country (Geumdaebong Peak to Daedeoksan Mountain), yew habitat around Janggunbong Peak, and Baekcheon Valley, the world's southernmost Lenok habitat.
The Hantaan River penetrates Cheorwon County's volcanic terrain, having several natural monuments. This area was a place of a fierce battle during the Korean War and is now a common rafting route. Around this river, the first Hantavirus hemorrhagic fever with renal syndrome virus, the Hantaan River virus was found. The virus was named after the river.   The Civilian Control Zone is near the Military Demarcation Line,  providing areas to stay for migratory birds, especially red-crowned cranes.  In the township of Haean, Yanggu, the Haean Basin is nicknamed Punchbowl, which was initially named by a war correspondent for the Korea War.

DMZ Museum 
The museum has a large amount of English in its narration of the history of the DMZ, as well as exhibits such as United States POW letters and extensive amounts of photos. It is inside the Tongil Security Park.

Gangneung-si (강릉시) 

Gangneung contains beaches connecting each other from north to south along the coast. These beaches are covered with pine tree forests, planted to block the sea breeze.

Cheorwon-gun (철원군)

The Second Tunnel 
"Found in the DMZ" was found by Korean guards listening to the sound of explosions under the ground during their shift. After determined excavation on March 19, 1975, "The Second Tunnel" was discovered. It was for a sudden raid by the North Korean Army into South Korea. The second tunnel is composed of a firm granitic layer, is 3.5 km in length, and various in depth from 50m-160m. About 1 km of it is nowadays open to visitors.

Woljeong-ri Station 
Woljeong-ri station is a historical building in the DMZ at Cheorwon.  The tourist attraction, which can only be visited on escorted security tours of the DMZ, is an abandoned train station on the northernmost end of Korail's Gyeongwon Line. Near the station there was a small yard where rail stock was stored or shunted before leaving for Wonsan, now in North Korea, along the former Gyeongwon Line. Behind the station building there is the wreck of a train, bombed during the Korean War, used by the North Korean army and bombed by U.N. forces. In 2012, it became a place where artists can meet and exhibit their works.

Sokcho-si (속초시)

Goseong Unification Observatory Building 
When the area was part of North Korea from 1945 to 1953, the building is now the closest most South Koreans can get to North Korea. There are binoculars installed on the viewing deck, and inside the observatory is a large map labelled with mountain names and the locations of military installations. Kiosks here sell liquor, cash, postage stamps and other souvenirs from North Korea. On a clear day, you can get a good view of Kumgang-san, about 20 km to the west. Despite the solemnity of the place, the parking lot is cluttered with souvenir shops and restaurants. On the other side of the lot is the Korean War Exhibition Hall.

Others 
Gangwon Province has many tourist attractions, as well as natural monuments, including Namiseom, Tong-il Observatory (similar the Dora Observatory), Soyang Dam and Jeongdongjin.  A memorial centre of the novelist Lee Hyo-seok is in Pyeongchang County. Along the coast of the East Sea, many seaside resorts are located, including Gyongpo Seaside Resort.

The only domestic casino in Gangwon is Kangwon Land, located in Jeongseon County.

The province also houses the largest ski resort in South Korea, Yongpyong Resort.

Religion 

According to the 2015 census, 16.4% of the population follow Buddhism and 24.1% follow Christianity (17.5% Protestantism and 6.6% Catholicism). 58.7% of the population is not religious and 0.8% of the population follow other religions.

Transportation

Railway 
Gangwon Province's railways were originally built to transport mining resources to harbours.

In Gangwon-Province, some main lines are operated. Jungang Line is connected to the Seoul Metropolitan Subway System, the Yeongdong Line and the Taebaek Line are derived from the Jungang Line, and the Gyeonggang Line was constructed, but currently it is not perfectly connected to the Seoul Metropolitan Subway System. KTX trains launched from Seoul to Gangneung on 22 December 2017 via the Gyeonggang Line, but they still run a part of the Jungang Line. In 2016, a plan was passed to extend the KTX line from Gangneung to Sokcho.

The Gyeongwon Line and the North Dong-hae Line are blocked by the Military Demarcation Line.

Air 
Gangwon Province has several military airbases, while civil passengers can use only two airports, Wonju Airport and Yangyang International Airport. Wonju Airport is shared with the Republic of Korea Air Force, like Daegu International Airport and Gimhae International Airport.

Currently Wonju and Yangyang Airport are now operated as domestic airports.

Road 
Some historical and traditional ridges have survived, like Daegwallyeong. It has many routes, like Route 7, which is included in AH6.

It also has Controlled-access highways. Yeongdong Expressway is the first express way in the region, and Gwangju–Wonju Expressway, Jungang Expressway, Donghae Expressway, Seoul–Yangyang Expressway were built, afterwards. Seoul–Yangyang Expressway has the longest road tunnel in South Korea.

Buses 
Like the railways, Gangwon Province is connected by intercity bus networks in South Korea. All cities and counties have intercity terminals, which connect other cities or counties in the region or connect outer cities, districts, and Incheon International Airport.

Sea
Gangwon Province has many harbours. Some harbours are fishing ports, but other harbours are used for special purposes. For example, Mukpo Harbour functions as an exporting hub for cement & coal from the Taebaek Mountains. Sokcho Harbour functions as a fishing port, a passenger harbour and as an exporting hub for iron ore. Also recently, Korea Gas Corporation built the LNG Platform Center at Hosan Harbour.

Gangwon province also has ferry lines. Sokcho Harbour has a pier for cruise ships, but until 2018, no cruise route existed.
 Domestic Ferries
 Gangneung Harbor, Mukpo Harbor – Ulleungdo
 International Ferries
 Donghae Harbor – Vladivostok, Sakaiminato, Tottori

Sports

Sport teams

Soccer 

Gangwon FC bases itself in the region, owned by Gangwon Province. Jin-seon Kim, the Governor of Gangwon Province announced it on April 28, 2008 and was established on December 18, 2008.

Ice Hockey 

High1 is Kangwon Land's ice hockey team, established in September 2009. South Korea has only 3 professional ice hockey clubs, including High1.

The Daeyung Killer Whales was established in 2016, originally based in the region.

Basketball 

Wonju DB Promy is a professional basketball team, based in Wonju, Gangwon Province. It was established is 1996. It donated coal in collaboration with a local government-owned company, Korea Coal Corporation.

List of Gangwon Province sport clubs

Sport Events 
The 1999 Asian Winter Games were held in Gangwon Province between January 30 and February 6, 1999. South Korea, the host nation ranked 2nd in these games.

The 2018 Winter Olympics was held from February 9–25, 2018, and the 2018 Winter Paralympics was held from March 9–18, 2018. Almost all of the events were held in Pyeongchang County. Alpine skiing events were held in Jeongseon County, while some indoor events were held in Gangneung.

The 2024 Winter Youth Olympics is scheduled to be held in Gangwon Province.

Municipalities 
The main cities of the province are Chuncheon (the provincial capital), Gangneung, Sokcho, Wonju, and Donghae. Currently Gangwon Province, has 7 cities, and 11 counties

Claimed

 Gimhwa County, Icheon County, Tongcheon County, Pyeonggang County and Hoeyang County

Friendship partners 
  Alberta, Canada
  Colorado, United States
  Jilin, China
  Tottori Prefecture, Japan
  Primorsky Krai, Russia
  Cebu, Philippines
  Special Region of Yogyakarta, Indonesia

See also 
 Gangwon Province (historical)

References

External links

 
  
 2018 Pyeongchang Winter Olympics, Official Homepage

 
Provinces of South Korea
Biosphere reserves of South Korea